2080 is a year in the 2080s decade

2080 may also refer to:
 The year 2080 BC in the 21st century BC
2080 (number)
2080 Jihlava, a main-belt asteroid 
Nvidia RTX 2080, a graphics card
NGC 2080, the Ghost Head Nebula
"2080", a song by Yeasayer from their album All Hour Cymbals

See also
20-80 rule, alternative name for the Pareto principle